Álvaro Ocaña Gil (born 2 February 1993) is a Spanish professional footballer who plays for Real Jaén as a defender.

Club career
Born in Teba, Province of Málaga, Ocaña played youth football with Málaga CF, but appeared solely for the reserves as a senior. In 2012, he joined Villarreal CF C and, the following year, signed for another lower league club, Écija Balompié from Segunda División B. On 5 January 2014 he scored his third and final goal of the season and contributed to a 2–0 home win against La Roda CF, but his team was eventually relegated.

On 6 June 2014, Ocaña moved to Doxa Katokopias FC, signing a two-year contract. He made his debut in top flight football on 14 September, featuring the full 90 minutes in a 0–4 home loss to AEL Limassol for the Cypriot First Division championship.

References

External links
 
 
 
 Álvaro Ocaña at La Preferente

1993 births
Living people
Sportspeople from the Province of Málaga
Spanish footballers
Footballers from Andalusia
Association football defenders
Atlético Malagueño players
Villarreal CF C players
Villarreal CF B players
Écija Balompié players
Doxa Katokopias FC players
CP Cacereño players
Marbella FC players
Real Jaén footballers
Segunda División B players
Tercera División players
Cypriot First Division players
Spanish expatriate footballers
Spanish expatriate sportspeople in Cyprus
Expatriate footballers in Cyprus